Seminibacterium is a Gram-negative genus of bacteria from the family of Pasteurellaceae with one known species (Seminibacterium arietis). Seminibacterium arietis has been isolated from the semen of a ram.

References

Pasteurellales
Bacteria genera
Monotypic bacteria genera